Deh Sukhteh-ye Dam Ludab (also Romanized as Deh Sūkhteh-ye Dam Lūdāb; also known as Deh Sūkhteh) is a village in Ludab Rural District, Ludab District, Boyer-Ahmad County, Kohgiluyeh and Boyer-Ahmad Province, Iran. At the 2006 census, its population was 244, in 54 families.

References 

Populated places in Boyer-Ahmad County